Dock2 (Dedicator of cytokinesis 2), also known as DOCK2, is a large (~180 kDa) protein involved in intracellular signalling networks. It is a member of the DOCK-A subfamily of the DOCK family of guanine nucleotide exchange factors (GEFs) which function as activators of small G proteins. Dock2 specifically activates isoforms of the small G protein Rac.

Discovery
Dock2 was first characterised as one of a number of proteins which shared high sequence similarity with the previously described protein Dock180, the archetypal member of the DOCK family. Whereas Dock180 expression is near ubiquitous in mammals, Dock2 appears to be expressed specifically in leukocytes and is considered to be the principal DOCK family member in these cells.

Structure and function
Dock2 is part of a large class of proteins (GEFs) which contribute to cellular signalling events by activating small G proteins. In their resting state G proteins are bound to Guanosine diphosphate (GDP) and their activation requires the dissociation of GDP and binding of guanosine triphosphate (GTP). GEFs activate G proteins by promoting this nucleotide exchange.

Dock2 and other DOCK family proteins differ from other GEFs in that they do not possess the canonical structure of tandem DH-PH domains known to elicit nucleotide exchange. Instead they possess a DHR2 domain which mediates Rac activation by stabilising it in its nucleotide-free state. They also contain a DHR1 domain which binds phospholipids and is required for the interaction between Dock2 and the plasma membrane. As with other members of the DOCK-A and DOCK-B subfamilies, Dock2 contains an N-terminal SH3 domain which is involved in binding to ELMO proteins (see below). Dock180 contains a C-terminal proline rich region which mediates binding to Crk, however, Dock2 lacks this feature despite the fact that it is able to bind the Crk-like protein CrkL.

Regulation of activity
Efficient Dock180 GEF activity in a cellular context is known to require the formation of a complex between Dock180 and its cognate adaptor proteins, which assist its translocation to the plasma membrane and binding to Rac. Similarly, Dock2 has been shown to form a complex with the well described DOCK-binding protein ELMO1 and this interaction is required for Dock2-mediated Rac activation in lymphocyte cell lines. ELMO proteins contain a C-terminal proline-rich region which binds to the N-terminal SH3 domain of DOCK proteins and mediates their recruitment to sites of high Rac availability (primarily the plasma membrane). ELMO proteins also contain a PH domain which appears to induce conformational changes in DOCK and thus allow binding to Rac.

Signalling downstream of Dock2
Like other DOCK-A and DOCK-B subfamily proteins Dock2 GEF activity is specific for Rac. Leukocytes express both Rac1 and Rac2 and Dock2 has been shown to bind and promote nucleotide exchange on both of these isoforms. Rac isoforms regulate a multitude of processes in leukocytes and studies so far have shown that Dock2-dependent Rac activation regulates the neutrophil NADPH oxidase and is also important for chemotaxis in neutrophils, lymphocytes and plasmacytoid dendritic cells. Dock2-dependent NADPH oxidase activation was reported in response to the soluble agonist fMLP, which acts via G protein-coupled receptors in neutrophils. Dock2-dependent chemotaxis has been reported in response to the chemokines CXCL12/SDF-1 in T lymphocytes, CXCL13/BLC in B lymphocytes and CCL19/ELC in thymocytes (immature lymphocytes) emigrating from the thymus as well as CCL21/SLC in ex vivo plasmacytoid dendritic cells. In neutrophil chemotaxis Dock2 signals downstream of the C5a and CXCL8/IL-8 receptors. Additional receptors which signal through Dock2 include the  T cell receptor/TCR and EDG1, a sphingosine-1-phosphate (S1P) receptor. The HIV-1 protein Nef is able to constitutively activate Dock2 in T lymphocytes which disrupts chemotaxis and immunological synapse formation thereby inhibiting the antiviral immune response.

Interactions
Dock2 has been shown to interact with CRKL.

References

Further reading

External links